Roslindale Baptist Church is an historic Baptist church at 52 Cummins Highway in the Roslindale neighborhood of Boston, Massachusetts.  The church was designed by Thomas Silloway in a Stick-Eastlake style, and built in 1884.  It is one of the best-preserved Stick style buildings in Roslindale, with decorative shingles and applied woodwork.  The congregation was organized in 1875, and met in a meeting hall (no longer standing) prior to the construction of this building.

The church was listed on the National Register of Historic Places in 1998.

See also
National Register of Historic Places listings in southern Boston, Massachusetts

References

Churches completed in 1884
19th-century Baptist churches in the United States
Baptist churches in Boston
Churches on the National Register of Historic Places in Massachusetts
National Register of Historic Places in Boston